Dawid Czubak (born 30 September 1998) is a Polish road and track cyclist, who last rode for UCI Continental team . Representing Poland at international competitions, Czubak competed at the 2016 UEC European Track Championships in the team pursuit event.

References

External links

1998 births
Living people
Polish male cyclists
Polish track cyclists
Place of birth missing (living people)
21st-century Polish people